Emanuel A. "Foxy" Flumere (June 17, 1912 – September 20, 1990) was an American football, basketball, and baseball coach.  He served as the head football coach at Northeastern University in 1942, compiling a record of 0–5–1.  Flumere was also the head basketball coach at Northwestern from 1942 to 1945, tallying a mark of 22–28.  He was head baseball coach at Northwestern from 1943 to 1944 and at Brandeis University from 1957 to 1961, amassing a career college baseball coach record of 38–70–4.

In 1939, Flumere played summer baseball for Bourne in the Cape Cod Baseball League, and was named second-team all-league second baseman.

Head coaching record

Football

References

External links
 Northeastern Hall of Fame profile
 

1912 births
1990 deaths
American men's basketball players
Bourne Braves players
Brandeis Judges baseball coaches
Brandeis Judges football coaches
Cape Cod Baseball League players (pre-modern era)
Northeastern Huskies baseball coaches
Northeastern Huskies baseball players
Northeastern Huskies football coaches
Northeastern Huskies football players
Northeastern Huskies men's basketball coaches
Northeastern Huskies men's basketball players
College men's basketball head coaches in the United States